Ascensión Esquivel Ibarra (10 May 1844 – 15 April 1923) was a Nicaraguan-born President of Costa Rica from 1902 to 1906. Esquivel became a naturalized Costa Rican in 1869.

He was also a lawyer and a university professor. After his presidential term, he served as the president of the Supreme Court of Costa Rica from 1917 to 1920.

President of Costa Rica
He first ran for the presidency in 1889 but was defeated by José Joaquín Rodríguez. He took up the challenge of running for president in the 1901 elections, which he consequently won. This was his second presidential bid and 1902 saw the start of his only presidency.

His government had to assume a nation with a still weak and little developed economy; however, his government managed to advance the development of the railroad to the Pacific and the establishment of the lyrics of the national anthem.

References

1844 births
1923 deaths
People from Rivas Department
Naturalized citizens of Costa Rica
Nicaraguan emigrants to Costa Rica
Presidents of Costa Rica
Vice presidents of Costa Rica
Foreign ministers of Costa Rica
Supreme Court of Justice of Costa Rica judges
19th-century Costa Rican people